Organic Lake is a lake in the Vestfold Hills in eastern Antarctica. It was formed 6,000 years ago when sea levels were higher; it is isolated, rather shallow , meromictic, a few hundred meters in diameter and has extremely salty water. It has the highest recorded concentration of dimethyl sulfide in any natural body of water.

In 2011, a new species of virophage (a satellite virus that impairs the ability of its co-infective host virus to replicate) was discovered in Organic Lake, the Organic Lake virophage. It is a parasite of 'Organic Lake phycodnavirus', a large virus that infects algae and belongs to the nucleocytoplasmic large DNA viruses (NCLDV), but in fact may rather be a member of an extended family Mimiviridae (aka Megaviridae) than of the family Phycodnaviridae.

References

Meromictic lakes
Lakes of Princess Elizabeth Land
Ingrid Christensen Coast